Chontacollo (possibly from Aymara chunta prolonged, lengthened, qullu mountain, "prolonged mountain") is a mountain in the north of the Barroso mountain range in the Andes of Peru, about  high. It is situated in the Tacna Region, Tarata Province, Tarata District. Chontacollo lies northwest of the mountain Iñuma.

References 

Mountains of Tacna Region
Mountains of Peru